Regina v Rumpole is a 1981 collection of short stories by John Mortimer about defence barrister Horace Rumpole. They were adapted from his scripts for the TV series of the same name.
The stories were:
"Rumpole and the Boat People"
"Rumpole and the Confession of Guilt" 
"Rumpole and the Dear Departed"
"Rumpole and the Expert Witness"
"Rumpole and the Gentle Art of Blackmail"
"Rumpole and the Rotten Apple"
"Rumpole and the Spirit of Christmas"
The collection also includes the novel Rumpole's Return. The collection was reissued in 1982 without that novel as Rumpole for the Defence.

References

Works by John Mortimer
1981 short story collections